This is a list of flag bearers who have represented Palestine at the Olympics.

Flag bearers carry the national flag of their country at the opening ceremony of the Olympic Games.

See also
Palestine at the Olympics

References

Palestine at the Olympics
Palestine
Olympic flagbearers